Konstantin Vladimirovich Kurokhtin (born 1 Jule 1978 in Moscow, Russia) is a Russian wheelchair curler playing as skip for the Russian wheelchair curling team. He and his team won gold medals at the World Wheelchair Curling Championships.

Career
Kurokhtin is a member of the local sports club "Moskvich" (Moscow). He participated at the 2018 Winter Paralympics and the 2016, 2017 and 2020 World Wheelchair Curling Championships.

Teams

References

External links 

Profile at the International Paralympic Committee's website

Living people
1978 births
Curlers from Moscow
Russian male curlers
Russian wheelchair curlers
Wheelchair curlers at the 2018 Winter Paralympics
Paralympic wheelchair curlers of Russia
World wheelchair curling champions